Theodore Alexander "Teddy" Lightner (14 September 1893 –  November 1981) was an American bridge player. He developed the Lightner double, a bridge bidding convention.

Lightner was born in Grosse Pointe, Michigan, and moved to Chicago and later to New York City.  He graduated from Yale University and from Harvard Law School. He was a lawyer and had a seat on the New York Stock Exchange. Apparently, he died from a heart attack days before his body was discovered in his New York apartment on November 22, 1981.

Lightner was inducted into the ACBL Hall of Fame in 1999.

According to Victor Mollo:No man stood so close to the emperor of bridge, Ely Culbertson, as Ted Lightner... For a part of the celebrated Battle of the Century match he was Ely Culbertson's partner - it was the part during which Culbertson gained his entire advantage over Lenz. He was in the Culbertson team which defeated the British in 1930, '33 and '34, and after winning every major event in America - Spingold, Vanderbilt, Life Master Pairs - he was at the top once more as world champion in 1953.

Contributions to bridge bidding theory 

The Lightner Double was not his most important contribution to the development of bridge bidding, but it bears his name because Culbertson was not keen on it and so did not claim it for himself. Lightner was the first to put forward the idea that a change of suit by responder should be forcing, prior to that only a jump in a new suit having been played as forcing. Though opening two bids to show a strong hand were used at the Cavendish Club in New York, the method was not used by the top young players of the late 1920s and early 1930s. To show an exceedingly strong hand a player would sometimes open 4NT or 5 of his suit. Lightner suggested that an opening two bid should be used to announce such very powerful hands. Both the one-over-one forcing principle and strong opening two bids were enthusiastically adopted by Culbertson.

Publications 

 High lights of the Culbertson System (The Bridge World, 1931), 238 pp., ; second ed. 1932, 242 pp., – "Theodore Alexander Lightner", 
 Famous hands of the Culbertson–Lenz match (Bridge World, 1932), 483 pp. – "analyzed by Ely Culbertson, Josephine Culbertson, Theodore A. Lightner [and] Waldemar von Zedtwitz; including additional analyses by Oswald Jacoby [and] Lieut. Alfred M. Gruenther", 
 Canasta for everyone, Sam Fry and Lightner (New York: Didier, 1949), 64 pp.,

Bridge accomplishments

Honors

 ACBL Hall of Fame, 1999

Wins

 Bermuda Bowl 1953

 North American Bridge Championships (10)
 von Zedtwitz Life Master Pairs (2) 1932, 1935 
 Fall National Open Pairs (1) 1928 
 Vanderbilt (1) 1930 
 Masters Team of 4 (1) 1937 
 Spingold (2) 1939, 1945 
 earlier Asbury Park Trophy (3) 1930, 1932, 1935

Runners-up

 North American Bridge Championships
 von Zedtwitz Life Master Pairs (2) 1931, 1947 
 Vanderbilt (5) 1937, 1938, 1939, 1941, 1945 
 Reisinger (3) 1932, 1934, 1947 
 Spingold (1) 1941 
 earlier Asbury Park Trophy (1) 1934

References

External links
 
 
 

1893 births
1981 deaths
American contract bridge players
Contract bridge writers
American stockbrokers
Yale University alumni
Harvard Law School alumni
People from Grosse Pointe, Michigan
People from Chicago
Writers from New York City
Lawyers from New York City
20th-century American lawyers